Flávio Paulino da Silva Filho (born 14 April 1989 in Santo André) is a Brazilian footballer who plays as a midfielder for União Recreativa dos Trabalhadores.

Career
On 22 July 2013, Flávio Paulino signed with Lokomotiv Plovdiv in Bulgaria on a two-year deal.

Statistics
As of 1 November 2013

References

External links

1989 births
Living people
Brazilian footballers
Brazilian expatriate footballers
First Professional Football League (Bulgaria) players
Liga Portugal 2 players
São Paulo FC players
Colo Colo de Futebol e Regatas players
Clube Atlético Bragantino players
São Carlos Futebol Clube players
Paulista Futebol Clube players
PFC Lokomotiv Plovdiv players
S.C. Covilhã players
Real Estelí F.C. players
Clube Atlético Metropolitano players
Sport Club São Paulo players
Concórdia Atlético Clube players
Camboriú Futebol Clube players
Ypiranga Futebol Clube players
União Recreativa dos Trabalhadores players
Brazilian expatriate sportspeople in Bulgaria
Brazilian expatriate sportspeople in Portugal
Expatriate footballers in Bulgaria
Expatriate footballers in Portugal
Expatriate footballers in Nicaragua
Association football midfielders
People from Santo André, São Paulo
Footballers from São Paulo (state)